This list contains famous classical music composers  who have lived in East Germany.

B
Thomas Böttger (1954)
Reiner Bredemeyer (1929–1995)
Max Butting (1888–1976)

D
Paul Dessau (1894–1979)
Gerd Domhardt (1945–1997)

E
Hanns Eisler (1898–1962)

F
Fidelio F. Finke (1891–1968)

G
Fritz Geißler (1921–1984)
Ottmar Gerster (1897–1969)
Lutz Glandien (1954)
Friedrich Goldmann (1941–2009)

H
Wolfgang Hohensee (1927)

K
Georg Katzer (1935–2019)
Günter Kochan (1930–2009)
Rainer Kunad (1936–1995)

M
Siegfried Matthus (1934–2021)
Rudolf Mauersberger (1889–1971)
Tilo Medek (1940–2006)
Ernst Hermann Meyer (1905–1988)

N
Gerd Natschinski (1928–2015)
Wilhelm Neef (1916–1990)
Walter Niemann (1876–1953)

S
Steffen Schleiermacher (1960)
Kurt Schwaen (1909–2007)
Leo Spies (1899–1965)

T
Johannes Paul Thilman (1906–1973)
Georg Trexler (1903–1979)

U
Jakob Ullmann (1958)

W
Rudolf Wagner-Régeny (1903–1969)
H. Johannes Wallmann (1952)

Z
Ruth Zechlin (1926–2007)
Udo Zimmermann (1943–2021)

East Germany
Classical composers
Classical composers